Uttara Centre metro station ( romanised: Uttora sentar metro steshen) is a metro station of the Dhaka Metro's MRT Line 6, located in Uttara, a suburb of Dhaka. The station commenced operation from 18 February 2023.

History
The Uttara Centre metro station was constructed under "Package CP-03". The notification of application for construction of raised bridges for stations and railways was published on 30 June 2015 and the last date for submission of applications was 9 September 2015. Italian-Thai Development Public Company Limited gets work contract for "Package CP-03". The agreement document was sent to the ministry on 29 March 2016 for NBR investigation and law and parliamentary investigation. The signing ceremony for the agreement package was held on 3 May 2017 at the Pan Pacific Sonargaon Hotel in Dhaka. Construction work started on 2 August 2017.

Transit Oriented Development Hub
There will be a TOD hub in all stations of Metro Rail Line-6. This TOD (Transit Oriented Development) hub houses shops, commercial office etc. According to authority the first TOD hub will be constructed in this station.

Station

Station layout

References

External link

Dhaka Metro stations
Railway stations opened in 2023
2023 establishments in Bangladesh